The Philippines participated at the 2018 Asian Para Games which was held in Jakarta, Indonesia from 6 to 13 October 2018.

57 athletes contested in 10 out of 18 events in the games with Francis Carlos Diaz serving as chef de mission of the Philippine delegation. According to Diaz, Filipino para-athletes had better preparation for this edition of the Games compared to the last edition held in 2014 in Incheon, South Korea. The Philippine Sports Commission, a sports government agency, has given an "astronomical" amount of financial aid to the athletes relative to aid given in the previous editions which was used to buy their training equipment and supplies and they had a year long of training similar to non para-athletes. They have also secured sponsorship from small-scale private firms.

With improved financial support from both the government and the private sector, and  the Philippines targeted to surpass its previous performance in the 2014 edition where the country won five silver and five bronze medals. The athletes were aiming to win the country's first gold medal in the Asian Para Games in this edition of the games. The delegation garnered 29 medals, ten of which were gold, and placed 11th overall improving from their 29th place finish at the 2014 games. Chess and swimming were the primary contributor to the Philippines' medal tally.

Medalist

Gold

Silver

Bronze

Multiple

Medal summary

By sports

By date

Archery
The Philippines has entered two archers.
Men

Women

Athletics
Nine athletes will represent the Philippines in the games.

Prudencia Panaligan
Andy Avellana
Jerrold Pete Mangliwan
Joel Balatucan
Evaristo Carbonel
Jeanette Acebeda
Marites Burce
Arman Dino
Cendy Asusano

Badminton
The Philippines entered three badminton players.
Men

Women

Mixed

Chess
The Philippines entered 12 chess players.

Men

Women

Cycling
Two cyclers was entered to conpete for the Philippines.

Track
Time Trial

Judo
The Philippines has entered three judokas.

Powerlifting
Five powerlifters will compete in the games.
Men

Women

Swimming
Five swimmers were entered for the games.

Ernie Gawilan
Gary Bejino
Roland Subido
Arnel Aba
Edwin Villanueva

Table tennis
The Philippines has entered six table tennis players.

Minnie Cadag
Benedicto Gaela
Pablo Catalan
Darwin Salvacion
Smith Billy Cartera
Josephine Medina

Ten pin bowling
Ten bowlers were entered for the games. Kim Ian Chi won a gold in the mixed singles TPB10 event.

Kim Ian Chi
Samuel Matias
Angelito Guloya
Christopher Yue
Francisco Ednaco
Jaime Manginga
Augusto Hernandez
Crisostomo Yao
Noel Espanol
Ruben San Diego

See also
Philippines at the 2018 Asian Games

References

2018
Asian Para Games
Nations at the 2018 Asian Para Games